Oscar Jermaine Bellfield (born January 11, 1990) is an American professional basketball player. He played college basketball for UNLV and played in the 2012 NBA Summer League for the Memphis Grizzlies. He then signed with the New York Knicks, but was waived at the end of the preseason.

In November 2012, Bellfield joined the Erie BayHawks for the 2012–13 season as an affiliate player. He was waived by the BayHawks on December 28, 2012. In March 2013, he signed with Panteras de Miranda in Venezuela.

References

External links 
NBA D-League Profile
Profile at Eurobasket.com
Úrvalsdeild Profile at KKI.is

1990 births
Living people
American expatriate basketball people in Iceland
American expatriate basketball people in Venezuela
American men's basketball players
Basketball players from Los Angeles
Erie BayHawks (2008–2017) players
Panteras de Miranda players
Point guards
UNLV Runnin' Rebels basketball players
Úrvalsdeild karla (basketball) players